Terje is a masculine given name of Scandinavian origin, a varian of Torgeir. In Estonia, it is a feminine given name. Notable people with the name include:

Given name

A–H
Terje Aa (born 1961), Norwegian bridge player
Terje Aasland (born 1965), Norwegian politician
Dag Terje Andersen (born 1957), Norwegian politician
Terje Andersen (born 1952), Norwegian speed skater and president of the Norwegian Skating Association
Terje Baalsrud (1914–2003), Norwegian newspaper editor
Terje Bakken (1978–2004), Norwegian black metal vocalist 
Olav Terje Bergo (born 1946), Norwegian journalist
Terje Bergstad (1938–2014), Norwegian painter and printmaker
Terje Bjørklund (born 1945), Norwegian pianist and composer
Terje Bratberg (born 1955), Norwegian historian and encyclopedist
Terje Breivik (born 1965), Norwegian politician and entrepreneur
Terje Brofos (aka Hariton Pushwagner; 1940–2018), Norwegian artist
Terje Dahl (1935–2017), Norwegian jockey and horse trainer 
Terje Dragseth (born 1955), Norwegian poet, author and film director
Terje Fjærn (1942–2016), Norwegian musician, orchestra leader and musical conductor
Terje Formoe (born 1949), Norwegian singer, songwriter, actor, playwright and author
Terje G. Simonsen (born 1963), Norwegian historian and nonfiction author
Terje Gewelt (born 1960), Norwegian upright-bassist
Terje Granerud (born 1951), Norwegian politician
Terje Grøstad (1925–2011), Norwegian painter and illustrator
Terje Gulbrandsen (1944–2015), Norwegian footballer
Terje Moe Gustavsen (1954–2019), Norwegian politician
Terje Håkonsen (born 1974), Norwegian snowboarder 
Terje Halleland (born 1966), Norwegian politician
Terje Hals (1937–2010), Norwegian jurist and police chief
Terje Hanssen (born 1948), Norwegian biathlete 
Terje Hartviksen (born 1950), Norwegian actor and theater director
Terje Hauge (born 1965), Norwegian football referee
Terje Haugland (born 1944), Norwegian long jumper
Terje Høilund, Norwegian handball player
Terje Holtet Larsen (born 1963), Norwegian journalist, novelist and writer
Terje Høsøien (born 1974), Norwegian football player

I–O
Terje Isungset (born 1964), Norwegian drummer and composer
Terje Joelsen (born 1968), Norwegian footballer
Terje Johansen (born 1941), Norwegian politician
Terje Johanssen (1942–2005), Norwegian poet
Rolf Terje Klungland (born 1963), Norwegian politician
Terje Kojedal (born 1957), Norwegian footballer
Terje Knudsen (born 1942), Norwegian politician
Terje Krokstad (born 1956), Norwegian biathlete
Terje Langli (born 1965), Norwegian cross-country skier
Terje Leonardsen (born 1976), Norwegian footballer
Terje Liverød (born 1955), Norwegian footballer and agent
Leif Terje Løddesøl (born 1935), Norwegian businessman
Terje Lømo (born 1935), Norwegian physiologist 
Terje Luik (born 1941), Estonian actress
Terje Mærli (born 1940), Norwegian playwright and theater director
Terje Meyer (1942–2020), Norwegian industrial designer
Terje Mikkelsen (born 1957), Norwegian conductor 
Terje Moe (1933–2009), Norwegian architect
Terje Moe (1943–2004), Norwegian painter
Terje Moland Pedersen (born 1952), Norwegian police officer and politician 
Terje Ness (born 1968), Norwegian chef
Terje Nilsen (1951–2019), Norwegian singer and songwriter
Terje Nordberg (born 1949), Norwegian comics artist, comics writer, magazine editor and painter 
Terje Nyberget (born 1953), Norwegian military officer and politician
Terje Olsen (born 1950), Norwegian footballer
Terje Olsen (born 1951), Norwegian politician
Terje Olsen (Todd Terje; born 1961), Norwegian DJ
Terje Olsen (born 1970), Norwegian footballer
Terje Ottar (born 1945), Norwegian politician
Jon Terje Øverland (born 1944), Norwegian alpine skier

P–Z
Terje Pedersen (born 1943), Norwegian javelin thrower
Terje Pennie (born 1960), Estonian actress
Terje Riis-Johansen (born 1968), Norwegian politician
Terje Rød-Larsen (born 1947), Norwegian diplomat, politician and sociologist
Terje Rollem (1915–1993), Norwegian military officer and member of the Norwegian Resistance
Terje Rypdal (born 1947), Norwegian guitarist and composer
Terje Sagvolden (1945–2011), Norwegian behavioral neuroscientist
Terje Sandkjær (born 1944), Norwegian politician
Terje Vik Schei (aka Tchort; b. 1974), Norwegian black metal musician
Terje Skarsfjord (1942–2018), Norwegian footballer and manager
Terje Skjeldestad (born 1978), Norwegian footballer
Terje Sølsnes (born 1945), Norwegian television presenter
Terje Søviknes (born 1969), Norwegian politician
Terje Steen (1944–2020), Norwegian ice hockey player
Terje Stigen (1922–2010), Norwegian author
Terje Svabø (born 1952), Norwegian journalist
Terje Thoen (1944–2008), Norwegian ice hockey player
Terje Thorslund (born 1945), Norwegian javelin thrower
Terje Tønnesen (born 1955), Norwegian violinist
Terje Totland (born 1957), Norwegian high jumper
Terje Trei (born 1967), Estonian politician
Terje Tvedt (born 1951), Norwegian academic, author and filmmaker
Terje Tysland (born 1951), Norwegian singer, songwriter and musician
Terje Vareberg (born 1948), Norwegian economist and business executive
Terje Venaas (born 1947), Norwegian jazz musician
Terje Wesche (born 1947), Norwegian sprint canoer 
Terje Winterstø Røthing (born 1977), Norwegian guitarist
Terje Wold (1899–1972), Norwegian judge and politician

Fictional characters 
Terje Vigen, an 1862 poem written by Henrik Ibsen
Terje Vigen, a 1917 Swedish film directed by Victor Sjöström, based on a poem of the same title
 

Norwegian masculine given names
Estonian feminine given names